Shop Angel is a 1932 American pre-Code drama film directed by E. Mason Hopper and starring Marion Shilling, Holmes Herbert and Anthony Bushell.

Cast
 Marion Shilling as Dorothy Hayes 
 Holmes Herbert as James Walton Kennedy 
 Anthony Bushell as Larry Pemberton 
 Walter Byron as Don Irwin 
 Dorothy Christy as Margot Kennedy 
 Creighton Hale as Maxie Morton 
 Hank Mann as Mr. Weinberg 
 Nan Preston as French Maid

References

Bibliography
 Clifford McCarty. Film Composers in America: A Filmography, 1911-1970. Oxford University Press, 2000.

External links
 

1932 films
1932 drama films
American drama films
Films directed by E. Mason Hopper
1930s English-language films
1930s American films